This article show all participating team squads at the 2001 FIVB Women's Volleyball World Grand Prix, played by eight countries with the final round held in Macau, China.

Head Coach: Marco Aurélio Motta

#9 Janina Conceição injured herself in the second weekend and was substituted by #19 Flávia Carvalho

Head Coach: Luis Felipe Calderon

Head Coach: Chen Zhonghe

Head Coach: Lee Hee-Wan

Head Coach: Masahiro Yoshikawa

Head Coach: Nikolay Karpol

Head Coach: Ryu Hao-Suk

Head Coach: Toshiaki Yoshida

References
 Line-ups

2001
2001 in volleyball